The Hajjah Fatimah Mosque is a mosque located along Beach Road in the Kampong Glam district within the Kallang Planning Area in Singapore. The mosque was designed in a mix of Islamic and European architectural styles, and completed in 1846. The mosque is named after an aristocratic Malay lady, Hajjah Fatimah, who commissioned its construction.

History

The building of the mosque was initiated by Hajjah Fatimah, who was originally from a wealthy Malaccan family. She married a Bugis prince from Celebes who ran a trading post in Singapore. In the late 1830s, her house was attacked twice, but she was away for the second one, and to express her gratitude for her safety, she instructed the building of a mosque on the site where the house once stood.

The mosque was designed by an unnamed British architect. It has been suggested that the minaret was designed by John Turnbull Thomson due to a perceived similarity to the design of the first spire of St Andrew's Cathedral, there is however no evidence for this. The mosque was built in 1846. The resulting tower leans slightly (around 6 degrees) off center.

The main prayer hall was rebuilt in the 1930s, based on design by architects Chung & Wong, and constructed by French contractors Bossard & Mopin with Malay workers. The rebuilding added more Islamic elements to the mosque, giving the mosque a mixture of styles.

Masjid Hajjah Fatimah was gazetted as a national monument on 28 June 1973. Today the mosque is owned by Majlis Ugama Islam Singapura (MUIS).

Architecture

The tower leans about six degrees off centre due to moisture seepage, shifting of bricks used in the construction of the tower, and the sandy soil on which it sits. The minaret is flanked by two houses in European style but with Chinese features, for example in its windows and woodwork.

See also
 Islam in Singapore
 List of mosques in Singapore

References

External links

 Masjid Hajjah Fatimah on the Uniquely Singapore website
 GoogleMaps StreetView of Masjid Hajjah Fatimah (background)
 GoogleMaps PhotoSphere of Masjid Hajjah Fatimah

1846 establishments in Singapore
Religious buildings and structures completed in 1846
Towers completed in 1846
Hajjah Fatimah
Tourist attractions in Singapore
National monuments of Singapore
Kallang
Inclined towers
Malaysian diaspora in Singapore
19th-century architecture in Singapore